R311 road may refer to:
 R311 road (Ireland)
 R311 road (South Africa)